1,3-Dinitrobenzene is an organic compound with the formula C6H4(NO2)2. It is one of three isomers of dinitrobenzene. The compound is a yellow  solid that is soluble in organic solvents.

Preparation 
1,3-Dinitrobenzene is accessible by nitration of nitrobenzene. The reaction proceeds under acid catalysis using sulfuric acid. The directing effect of the nitro group of nitrobenzene leads to 93% of the product resulting from nitration at the meta-position. The ortho- and para-products occur in only 6% and 1%, respectively.

Reactions 
Reduction of 1,3-dinitrobenzene with sodium sulfide in aqueous solution leads to 3-nitroaniline.  Further reduction with iron and hydrochloric acid (HCl) gives m-phenylenediamine.

References 

Nitrobenzenes